The 2019 Uzbekistan League Cup is the 7th season of the annual Uzbekistan League Cup, the knockout football cup competition of Uzbekistan.

Group stage

Group A

Group B

Group C

Group D

Cup
Uzbekistan